Ian Alexander Phillips (born 23 April 1959) is a Scottish former professional footballer who played as a fullback in The Football League for Mansfield, Peterborough, Northampton, Colchester in two spells and Aldershot. He left Colchester after his second spell to become player-manager of Halstead Town. In 1999, he was approached by Clacton Town to take over as their Manager, but he declined.

References

External links
 
 Ian Phillips at Colchester United Archive Database
 

1959 births
Living people
People from Cumnock
Scottish footballers
Association football defenders
Mansfield Town F.C. players
Peterborough United F.C. players
Northampton Town F.C. players
Colchester United F.C. players
Aldershot F.C. players
Kettering Town F.C. players
Halstead Town F.C. players
Scottish football managers
Halstead Town F.C. managers
Footballers from East Ayrshire